Freden is a former Samtgemeinde ("collective municipality") in the district of Hildesheim, in Lower Saxony, Germany. Its seat was in the village Freden. On 1 November 2016 it was dissolved.

The Samtgemeinde Freden consisted of the following municipalities:

 Everode 
 Freden
 Landwehr 
 Winzenburg

Former Samtgemeinden in Lower Saxony